Be Brave is the second and final studio album by the band The Strange Boys. It was released on March 16, 2010 via In the Red Records.

Critical reception
According to Metacritic, Be Brave has an average score of 69/100, indicating "generally favorable reviews" from critics.

Track listing
 "I See" - 3:08
 "A Walk On The Bleach" - 3:05
 "Be Brave" - 2:58
 "Friday In Paris" - 2:17
 "Between Us" - 3:20
 "Da Da" - 2:32
 "Night Might" - 2:13
 "Dare I Say" - 2:31
 "Laugh At Sex, Not Her" - 2:57
 "All You Can Hide Inside" - 2:11
 "The Unsent Letter" - 2:02
 "You Can't Only Love When You Want To" - 3:15

Personnel
Ryan Sambol: Guitar, Vocals, Harmonica
Philip Sambol: Bass
Greg Enlow: Guitar
Mike La Franchi: Drums
Jenna E. Thornhill DeWitt: Vocals, Sax
Tim Presley: Vocals, Laughs

References

2010 albums
Rough Trade Records albums
The Strange Boys albums
In the Red Records albums